Back to Life may refer to:

Books
Back to Life: Poems from behind the Iron Curtain, 1958, ed. Robert Conquest
Back to Life (novel), 2004 novel by Wendy Coakley-Thompson
Back to Life, The Rachel Riley Diaries, 2009 novel by Joanna Nadin

Film and TV
Back to Life (1913 film), American silent short drama featuring Lon Chaney
Back to Life (1925 film), American silent war drama film
Back to Life (TV series), 2019 British TV show

Music

Albums
Back to Life (Fred Frith album), 2008 album by Fred Frith
Back to Life (Sandra album), 2009 album by Sandra
Back to Life (Steve Roach album), 2012 album by Steve Roach
Back to Life (Anthony Evans album), 2017 album by Anthony Evans
Back 2 Life, a 2013 album by Sean Kingston
Back 2 Life (LeToya Luckett album), 2017 album by LeToya Luckett

Songs
"Back to Life (However Do You Want Me)", 1989 song by British R&B band Soul II Soul
"Back to Life" (Alicia Keys song), 2016
"Back to Life" (Hailee Steinfeld song), 2018
"Back to Life" (Rascal Flatts song)
"Back 2 Life (Live It Up)", 2012 song by Sean Kingston
"Back 2 Life" (song), 2016 song by LeToya Luckett
"Back to Life", by Sugababes from The Lost Tapes, 2022

See also
"Coming Back to Life", 1994 song by Pink Floyd
Eaten Back to Life, 1990 album by Cannibal Corpse